Johann Georg Fischer (21 January 1673 – 26 April 1747) was a stonemason and builder. He stood for a long time in the shadow of his famous uncle, Johann Jakob Herkomer (1652–1717).

Fischer's son Franz Karl later stepped into his father's professional footsteps.

His works include the Parish church of St. Gallus and Ulrich in Kißlegg, where there is also a road named after him.

References

17th-century German architects
1673 births
1747 deaths
18th-century German architects
Bavarian architects
People from Ostallgäu
Stonemasons